The 12th BRDC International Trophy was a motor race, run to Formula One rules, held on 14 May 1960 at the Silverstone Circuit, England. The race was run over 50 laps of the Silverstone Grand Prix circuit, and was won by British driver Innes Ireland in a Lotus 18. The race was marred by the death of experienced American driver Harry Schell in a violent accident during practice in wet conditions.

The field also included several Formula Two cars. They were the Coopers of Denis Hulme, Tony Marsh, John Campbell-Jones, Tim Parnell and Chris Bristow.

Results

Other cars
Stirling Moss also practised in a different Cooper-Climax (car #20T) but it was damaged in an accident. He subsequently practised and raced Ken Gregory's car.
John Surtees also practised in a privately entered Formula Two Cooper-Climax (car #32) but did not race it. He may also have been entered for the race in a Vanwall, but this is not confirmed.

References

 "The Grand Prix Who's Who", Steve Small, 1995.
 "The Formula One Record Book", John Thompson, 1974.
 Results at www.silhouet.com 

BRDC International Trophy
BRDC International Trophy
BRDC
BRDC International Trophy